The Ikarus 260 is a high-floor, three-door bus for city and suburban transportation purposes. It was made from 1971 to as long as 2002 by the Hungarian bus manufacturer Ikarus, making it the longest manufactured, largest quantity model of the factory.

History 

The model featured a high-floor body, with the engine mounted under the floor in order to spare space and achieve better weight distribution. Design began in 1966, with the main designer being László Finta, the designer of the predecessing Ikarus 556 and 180 models. The first three prototypes left the Mátyásföld plant in 1970, with serial production starting in 1972.

With Hungary being the leading bus manufacturer in the Comecon area, the demand for the new model quickly grew famous. Outside Hungary, the largest importers were the Soviet Union and the GDR, but the model drew so much attention that it reached outside the Iron Curtain, with vehicles being exported as far as Iceland or Taiwan.

In its native Hungary, the model was a long-term success. Every bus company used 260s to cover their routes from city to suburban, and even sometimes interurban traffic. During its peak in the 1980s, Ikarus 260, along with its articulated urban counterpart, the Ikarus 280, and its interurban counterparts, the Ikarus 250 and Ikarus 266 were almost exclusively the sole bus models that the general public could board for their respective rides.

The factory, overgrowing with confidence in the model's success, turned little attention towards developing the successor of the increasingly obsolete 260s, the Ikarus 415. Instead, Ikarus invested in a huge re-manufacturing effort in the late 80s to replace the aged out fleet of their Hungarian and Soviet partners, with only minor optical differences applied compared to the original buses dating to the early seventies. While the plan worked short-term, the lack of modernization later came with grave consequences.

In the 1990s, the factory experimented with a modernized facelift version of the 200 series, culminating in the Ikarus Classic series, where the 2 was replaced with a C in the model code (i. e. Ikarus 280 -> Ikarus C80). While popular with the suburban and interurban companies of Hungary, it failed to draw attention as it was too obsolete for the international market.

The last ever Ikarus 260 left the Székesfehérvár plant in 2002, and became a part of the Szeged local transport system.

References

Bibliography 
Gerlei Tamás, Kukla László, dr. Lovász György: Az Ikarus évszázados története. Budapest: Maróti Könyvkereskedés és Könyvkiadó Kft. 2008. ISBN 9789639005853

External links 

Ikarus buses
Step-entrance buses
Vehicles introduced in 1972